Hilarographa perakana is a species of moth of the family Tortricidae. It is found in Malaysia.

The wingspan is about 16 mm. The ground colour of the forewings is pale orange in the form of three lines, followed by some rows of spots. There are three basal lines, tinged with reddish. The hindwings are brown.

Etymology
The specific name refers to the type location, Perak.

References

Moths described in 2009
Hilarographini